Castle Crest, also known as the Merrill-Sanders-Holman House, is a historic mansion in Jackson, Mississippi, U.S.. It was built for businessman I.W. Merrill in 1929–1930. By 1980, it belonged to Henry Holman and his wife Sondra. The house was designed in the Tudor Revival style by architect Joe Frazer Smith. It has been listed on the National Register of Historic Places since March 22, 2010.

References

Houses on the National Register of Historic Places in Mississippi
Tudor Revival architecture in the United States
Houses completed in 1930
Houses in Jackson, Mississippi
National Register of Historic Places in Jackson, Mississippi